Jung Jae-Kwon is a South Korean footballer. Since 2008, he has played for Seoul United in the Challengers League as well as coached Hanyang University.

Club career 
1993 Industrial Bank of Korea FC - (Semi-professional)
1994-1999 Pusan Daewoo Royals
1998 Vitória FC - on loan
2000-2001 Pohang Steelers

International goals
Results list South Korea's goal tally first.

External links
 
 National Team Player Record 
 FIFA Player Statistics
 

1970 births
Living people
Association football wingers
South Korean footballers
South Korean expatriate footballers
South Korea international footballers
Busan IPark players
Vitória F.C. players
Pohang Steelers players
K League 1 players
Korea National League players
K3 League (2007–2019) players
Primeira Liga players
Expatriate footballers in Portugal
South Korean expatriate sportspeople in Portugal